Jayme de Amorim Campos (born November 16, 1958) is a Brazilian singer, songwriter, pastor, televangelist, and radio broadcaster. He does a morning program for the radio.

Campos was born in São Paulo. He is the brother of Jorginho, former player and technical assistant of the Brazilian Soccer Team, from 2006 to 2010 and current coach of the Coritiba.

In addition to radio and TV experiences, he also accepted to record his first CD, and was released in 2006.

Discography
Minhas Canções na Voz do Pastor Jayme de Amorim Vol. 3 (2012)
Minhas Canções na Voz do Pastor Jayme de Amorim Vol. 2 (2009)
Minhas Canções na Voz do Pastor Jayme de Amorim (2008)
Crer é a saída (2006)

References

1958 births
Living people
Brazilian singer-songwriters
Television evangelists
People from São Paulo